Nick Bilton is a British-American journalist, author, and filmmaker. He is currently a special correspondent at Vanity Fair.

Life and career 
Bilton was born in Darlington, UK, and grew up in Leeds. He attended Marjory Stoneman Douglas High School in Parkland, Florida. He has degrees from The New School and the School of Visual Arts. He worked in the film and advertising industries.

Bilton worked at The New York Times from 2003 to 2016, as a design editor in the newsroom and a researcher in the research and development labs. Before he left, he was a technology columnist and the lead writer for the Bits blog. He writes on a range of technology topics, including the "future of technology and the social impact of the internet on our culture and media".

His reporting is credited with helping to lead the United States Federal Aviation Administration to overturn their longtime ban on using cell phones, Kindles and iPads on airplanes. Jeff Bezos gave credit to Bilton during Amazon's 2013 earnings report for overturning the ban, saying "a big hat tip to Nick Bilton on that one."

In 2016, he left The New York Times to become a special correspondent for Vanity Fair, where he writes features and columns. He co-wrote the 2015-2019 Vanity Fair New Establishment List. He is also a contributor to CNBC, where he discusses technology and business topics.

Bilton is the former host of the podcast Inside the Hive with Nick Bilton that he co-created with Vanity Fair and Cadence13.

Fake Famous
In 2021, HBO released Fake Famous, a documentary film Bilton wrote, directed and produced about social media and influencer culture. In the film, Bilton and a documentary team purchased fake bots and fake engagement for three participants to see if they would be perceived as “famous” by the public.

Twitter lawsuit
In 2016, Bilton fought, and won, a 1st Amendment lawsuit when he was deposed to testify in a class action lawsuit against Twitter, after an article he wrote in Vanity Fair, “Twitter Is Betting Everything on Jack Dorsey. Will It Work?” alleged that the company knowingly deceived investors in 2015 about its users’ daily and monthly engagement with the site. The article featured “a tempestuous discussion” between Anthony Noto, the chief financial officer and Gabriel Stricker, the director of communications who argued that the company “come clean” about the company’s stagnant growth numbers. The story subsequently led to a $6 billion lawsuit against Twitter and an investigation by the Securities and Exchange Commission. In September 2021, Twitter settled the lawsuit for $809 million.

Books

He is the author of three books: I Live in the Future & Here's How It Works: Why Your World, Work, and Brain Are Being Creatively Disrupted (2010), Hatching Twitter: A True Story of Money, Power, Friendship, and Betrayal (2013), and American Kingpin: The Epic Hunt for the Criminal Mastermind Behind the Silk Road (2017). 

Hatching Twitter told the story of the Twitter's early days and its four founders—Evan Williams, Jack Dorsey, Noah Glass, and Biz Stone—who are portrayed as "mediocrities, narcissists and mopers who seem to spend as much time on scheming, self-promotion and self-destruction as on anything else", according to Tim Wu's review in the Washington Post. It was on The New York Times bestseller list and was voted Best Book of the Year on The Wall Street Journal Reader's Choice. The book was optioned by Lionsgate and is currently being turned into a TV series. Published in May 2017, Bilton's book, American Kingpin, tells the story of the Silk Road marketplace, its founder Ross Ulbricht (who went by "Dread Pirate Roberts"), and how U.S. law enforcement arrested him. The book debuted at #9 on The New York Times business bestseller list. In June 2017, The Hollywood Reporter reported that the Coen brothers and Steven Zaillian were adapting the book into a movie.

Filmography

References

External links

 Official website
 American Kingpin

Year of birth missing (living people)
Living people
British male journalists
People from Darlington
British emigrants to the United States
American male journalists
The New York Times writers
Technology writers